Gathorne-Hardy is a British aristocratic family. The first part of the name is pronounced with a long 'a', i.e. as if "gay-thorn". The founder of the family was Gathorne Gathorne-Hardy, 1st Earl of Cranbrook, a prominent Tory politician and favourite of Queen Victoria who adopted the hyphenated surname Gathorne-Hardy. The "eccentric Gathorne-Hardys" as they are sometimes known, have produced many notable members of 19th and 20th century British society.

History 

Gathorne Gathorne-Hardy (born Gathorne Hardy) was the youngest son of Sir John Hardy, of the manor of Horsforth, Yorkshire. His elder brothers included Sir John Hardy, 1st Baronet and Charles Hardy, owner of Chilham Castle. Hardy's ancestors were stewards to the Spencer-Stanhope family in the 18th century. John Hardy was educated in Switzerland where his contemporaries included Lord Lyndhurst and Daniel O'Connell, before returning to England and training for the bar. He married the heiress Lady Isobel Gathorne, daughter of Richard Gathorne of Kirkby Lonsdale, Westmorland.

Gathorne Hardy, an eminent politician who held cabinet office in every government between 1858 and 1892, was a strong advocate for intervention in Russo-Turkish war (1877–1878) and as Secretary of State for India, the Second Anglo-Afghan war (1878–1880). He was a key ally of Prime minister Benjamin Disraeli and gained the full confidence of Queen Victoria.

In 1892 Gathorne-Hardy was made Earl of Cranbrook, along with the subsidiary titles: Viscount Cranbrook, Baron Medway and Lord Gathorne-Hardy. The Earls of Cranbrook were previously seated at Hemsted Park, Benenden, but later moved to Great Glemham House, near Saxmundham, Suffolk. The Hardy Baronets (see Hardy Baronets of Dunstall), a branch of the family, were seated at Dunstall Hall, near Burton upon Trent, Staffordshire, and served as High Sheriffs of Staffordshire and commissioners of the peace for Yorkshire.

Lady Isobel Gathorne-Hardy was a famed society hostess and royal courtier, the daughter of Lord Frederick Stanley, 16th Earl of Derby, Colonial Secretary and Governor General of Canada. She married Hon. John Francis Gathorne-Hardy, a distinguished general who served in Italy and on the Western front during the First World War and later held commands in Egypt and India.

Hon. Edward Gathorne-Hardy was a notorious bohemian traveller, author, botanist, antiquarian and socialite. He was the second son of Gathorne Gathorne-Hardy, 3rd Earl of Cranbrook and Dorothy Boyle, daughter of the 7th Earl of Glasgow. His grandfather was the 2nd Earl of Cranbrook, son of Gathorne Gathorne-Hardy, 1st Earl of Cranbrook. Edward, an eccentric and bisexual man, was rumoured to have been in a relationship with Anthony Eden. He published several works on botany, history and classical civilisation. Edward lived in Athens, Cairo and Beirut as "Mediterranean hedonism and botanic and archaeological curiosity drew him to the Levant". He died at his home in Athens in 1978.

Edward's younger brother, Hon. Robert Gathorne-Hardy was also an avid botanist, often working with his brother and publishing several works. He is best known for his close friendship with Ottoline Morrell and for founding the 'Uffizi society' which included Anthony Eden, Lord David Cecil and Bertrand Russell.

The present Earl, Gathorne Gathorne-Hardy, 5th Earl of Cranbrook is a noted zoologist, naturalist and farmer formerly active in Malaysia. He succeeded his father in 1978 and since then has sat in the House of Lords as a Conservative hereditary peer. His wife, Caroline, Countess of Cranbrook, is a noted food campaigner who King Charles praised as the "doughtiest fighter for good sense in agriculture".

The heir of the family is John Jason Gathorne-Hardy, Lord Medway (known as Jason; born 1968).

Notable people 
 Alfred Gathorne-Hardy (18451918), British politician, younger son of the 1st Earl
 Lady Anne Gathorne-Hardy (1911-2006), British bookseller and author 
 Caroline Gathorne-Hardy, Countess of Cranbrook (born Caroline Jarvis, 1935), British agricultural campaigner, wife of the 5th Earl
 Lady Dorothy Gathorne-Hardy (1889-1977), wife of Rupert D'Oyly Carte, founder of the Savoy Hotel
 Edward Gathorne-Hardy (19011978), British antiquarian, author and traveller, second son of the 3rd Earl
 Francis Gathorne-Hardy (18741949), British general, younger son of the 2nd Earl
 Gathorne Gathorne-Hardy, 1st Earl of Cranbrook (18141906), British politician, founder of the family
 Gathorne Gathorne Hardy, 3rd Earl of Cranbrook (1870-1915), British peer and socialite, married Dorothy Boyle, daughter of the 7th Earl of Glasgow
 Gathorne Gathorne-Hardy, 5th Earl of Cranbrook (born 1933), British peer and zoologist, formerly based in Malaysia
 Geoffrey Malcolm Gathorne-Hardy (18781972), British soldier, writer and Norse specialist, son of Hon. Alfred Gathorne-Hardy
 Lady Isobel Gathorne-Hardy (born Isobel Stanley, 18751963), British ice hockey enthusiast, socialite and royal courtier, married Hon. Francis Gathorne-Hardy
 Jane Gathorne-Hardy, Countess of Cranbrook (born Jane Stewart Orr, 1813–1897), wife of the 1st Earl
 John Jason Gathorne-Hardy, Lord Medway (born 1968), peer and artist, son and heir of the 5th Earl
 John David Gathorne-Hardy, 4th Earl of Cranbrook (1900-1978), British peer, soldier and historian  
 John Hardy (1773-1855), politician and businessman, father of 1st Earl of Cranbrook and Sir John Hardy, 1st Baronet
 Sir John Gathorne-Hardy, 1st Baronet (1809-1888), British politician, businessman, landowner and brother of the 1st Earl of Cranbrook
 John Stewart Gathorne-Hardy, 2nd Earl of Cranbrook (18391911), British peer and politician
 Jonathan Gathorne-Hardy (19332019), British author, son of Hon. Antony Gathorne-Hardy and grandson of the 3rd Earl
 Nigel Gathorne-Hardy (1880–1958), British soldier, married daughter of New Zealand politician Charles Johnston, youngest son of the 2nd Earl
 Moffy Gathorne-Hardy (born 1994), British model and socialite, granddaughter of Jonathan Gathorne-Hardy
 Margaret Evelyn Gathorne-Hardy, Viscountess Goschen (1858–1943), eldest daughter of the 1st Earl, married the 2nd Viscount Goschen, Viceroy of India
 Lady Margot Gathorne-Hardy (1913–2006), daughter of Hon. Nigel Gathorne-Hardy, married Sir Donald Hamish Cameron of Lochiel, Chief of Clan Cameron
 Patrick Gathorne-Hardy (1911–1966), British soldier and businessman, son of Hon. Nigel Gathorne-Hardy
 Robert Gathorne-Hardy (19021973), British botanist, writer and socialite, son of the 3rd Earl

See also 
 Earl of Cranbrook, a title in the British peerage created for Gathorne Gathorne-Hardy

References